The wingless insect order Notoptera, a group first proposed in 1915, had been largely unrecognized since its original conception, until resurrected in 2004. As now defined, the order comprises five families, three of them known only from fossils, two known from both fossil and living representatives, and fewer than 60 known species in total.

History of research
The name was originally coined in 1915 for a group of fossil orthopteroids, and largely forgotten until it was resurrected and redefined ("Notoptera Crampton sensu novum") by Engel and Grimaldi in 2004 (after the discovery of living Mantophasmatidae), who recommended to give a single order that includes both the living and fossil representatives of the lineage. 

Terry and Whiting in 2005 independently proposed a new name, "Xenonomia", for the same lineage of insects (including the Grylloblattodea and Mantophasmatodea).

In 2006, Cameron, Barker, and Whiting studied the mitochondrial genomics of the Mantophasmatodea, and Arillo and Engel described a new (fourth) species of rock crawler. 

In 2008, Damgaard and colleagues examined the mitochondrial genome of 8 described and 4 undescribed austrophasmatine species, and some mantophasmatines; the major clades were confirmed.

In 2012, Predel and colleagues studied the peptidomics of 71 populations of Mantophasmatodea, confirming that austrophasmatines are a monophyletic lineage, and noting that the development of the capa-neurons of the ventral nervous system implies a close relationship with the Grylloblattodea.

Gallery

See also
 Grylloblattidae
 Mantophasmatidae

Further reading
Ando H. 1982. Biology of the Notoptera. Kashiyo-Insatsu Co. Ltd., Nagano, Japan.

References

External links

 
Insect orders
Extant Triassic first appearances
Polyneoptera